An-Nasir Muhammad (January 17, 1680 – August 23, 1754), was a Yemeni Sayyid who twice claimed the Zaidi imamate of Yemen, in 1723 and 1727–1729.

Muhammad bin Ishaq was a grandson of Imam al-Mahdi Ahmad (died 1681). In 1723, while staying in Mashriq, he proclaimed his da'wah (call for the imamate) under the name an-Nasir Muhammad. The proclamation was done in opposition to the current Imam al-Mutawakkil al-Qasim. However, a well-known man of letters, Muhammad bin Isma'il al-Amir, managed to bring about a reconciliation. When al-Mutawakkil al-Qasim died in 1727, an-Nasir Muhammad once again claimed the imamate from his base in Zafar, north-west of San'a. He had the support of the Hashid and Bakil tribesmen, and from the Sayyid lord of Kawkaban.

He was opposed by the deceased Imam's son al-Mansur al-Husayn II who held San'a. The leader of the tribesmen went to parley with al-Mansur al-Husayn but was assassinated in the latter's tent. This led to great consternation among the tribes and a round of indecisive fighting. For a brief time al-Mansur al-Husayn appears to have acknowledged an-Nasir Muhammad as Imam. Later, however, he captured the sons of an-Nasir Muhammad, and the Imam came to his opponent's court in about 1729 to do homage. He was well received, and al-Mansur al-Husayn assigned maintenance for him. One of an-Nasir Muhammad's sons stayed in confinement, while he himself withdrew to private life until his death in 1754.

See also

 Imams of Yemen
 History of Yemen

References

Zaydi imams of Yemen
1754 deaths
1680 births
17th-century Arabs
18th-century Arabs